Patrick Parisot was a former Canadian diplomat. He was Ambassador Extraordinary and Plenipotentiary to Norway, Cuba, Algeria, Portugal and previously to Chile.

In 2010, Parisot resigned as Ambassador to Algeria to become Principal Secretary to then-Liberal Leader Michael Ignatieff.

Parisot is a former Special Policy Advisor and Press Secretary for then-Prime Minister Jean Chrétien .

A graduate of UdeM, UQAM,  Parisot was as a broadcaster with Radio-Canada  and TQS.

References

External links 
 Foreign Affairs and International Trade Canada diplomatic history

Year of birth missing (living people)
Living people
Ambassadors of Canada to Algeria
Ambassadors of Canada to Portugal
Ambassadors of Canada to Chile